Colourday Festival is a summer festival in Greece with music and coloured powder. It takes place on a weekend in June, from 12 noon to 11 pm. It is considered to be one of the most famous festivals in Greece, with more than 40,000 attendees, and it is more popular in younger audiences. 
Colour Day Festival from 2018 is also organized in Albania, while other European countries will follow.

Beginnings 
Colourday Festival first took place in Athens on June 20, 2015, with more than 32,000 attendees. The first Festival was held in OAKA Stadium. During the Festival, there were three throwings of coloured power, starting at 5 pm. At the end of the night, everyone is being covered with colour. According to news.gr, more than 100,000 bags of colour were used at the first Colourday Festival.

Growth 

 2015 | 20 June 2015| OAKA | 23 artists | 32.000 attendees. 
 2016 | 18 June 2016 | OAKA | 21 artists| 40.000 attendees. 
 2017 |17 June 2017 | OAKA | 22 artists| 27.000 attendees 
 2018 | 30 June & 1 July 1 and the second day was dedicated to coloured water | OAKA | 42 artists | 52.000 attendees. 
 2019 | 29 & 30 June 30 | OAKA | 41 artists | 46.000 attendees. On September 14, 2019, the Greek audience have for the first time the opportunity to live the Colour Day Festival Experience trough a television movie on SKAI TV channel. The movie is now online and you can find it on YouTube.
 2020 | Colour Day Festival was cancelled because of the coronavirus outbreak
 2021 | Colour Day Festival was cancelled because of the coronavirus outbreak
 2022| 25 June 2022 | OAKA | 36 artists|21.000 attendees We introduced to the audience the fundamental values of the festival by rebranding our logo and sharing our motto "Love Yourself. Find Your Colour".

How it works

Procedure 
The festival begins at 12 noon. The first guests arrive and some local warm-up DJs are performing. Each of the acts plays for about 20–30 minutes. –2 hours. At 5 pm everyone comes together for the first simultaneous colour throw of the day. This is then repeated twice. At about 11pm the event is over and the music stops. The festival usually takes place on a Saturday. An aftermovie video is produced after each event  and onsite photo team follows each event, publishing pictures on the respective Facebook pages.

Set Up 
There is one large stage where the DJs or the artists perform. There are also kiosks for food and drinks and kiosks for medical care. The colour powder is provided with the ticket, but can also be bought at the festival as well, along with various merchandise products, like T-shirts and hats.

Line Up

2015 

Agent Greg
Dino MFU
DJ Marnick
DJ Young & Tay
GOD IS A DJ.GR (Sparky T, Anastasio, M. Koutsakos)
HouseTwins
Instamix
Michael Tsaousopoulos
Mossel
Robin Skouteris
Live Act: Melisses

Special Guests 
Claydee
Playmen
Sad Puppy
DJ The Boy
B-Sykes
Yalena
Ermal Mamaqi

2016 

A Flow Mobz
Anastasio
Arva & Anastasios Rammos
Asterios Haritos
Dino MFU
George Siras
HouseTwins
Michael Tsaousopoulos
Mossel
Playmen
Sysex
The Mode
Xenia Ghali
Live Act: Melisses

Special Guests 
Andy Nicolas
Claydee
Faydee
Lariss

2017 
95,2 Athens Deejay Live (Γιάννης Τουμπάνος)
Sia Bou
Nikko Sunset
Cammora
DJ Marnick
Instamix
Armando Junior
Consoul Trainin
The Mode
Steve
Έλενα Παπαρίζου
Bang La Decks
MAD MAC
X-Factor Team
HouseTwins
Jenn Morel
OtherView
Xenia Ghali
Onirama
Μιχάλης Τσαουσόπουλος
Dino MFU

2018

Live Acts 
Rec Vegas  Otherview  The Players  Duo Violins  Ace2ace  The Mode  Runninsquad  Iss James  Booty Panda

DJs 
Michael Tsaousopoulos Dino Mfu  Xenia Ghali  Consoul Trainin  Maria Antona  John Toubanos  Nikko Sunset  Pritanis  Ad1  Goldsmile  Inx  Sergio T  Jesse Onix  Bestseller  Bobito

2019

Live Acts 
Εleni Foureira
Era Istrefi
Sin Boy
Rec
Mikolas Josef
Kazka
Saske
Solmeister Ft Wnc
Otherview Ft Josephine
The Players
Claydee
Prince Karma
Slogan
Mente Fuerte
Goin’ Through Feat Family
Havana
The Mode
Steve #Onemanshow
Bobito Ft Lila Trianti
Showtime Party

Djs 
Michael Tsaousopoulos
Consoul Trainin
Bang La Decks
Ace 2 Ace
Dino Mfu Ft Andrea Casta
Xenia Ghali
George Siras
Antonis Dimitriadis
Mossel
Mark F Angelo
Chris Child
Steve Kis
John Toubanos
Herc Deeman
Dim Chord
Nikko Sunset
Sergio T
Delacruz
Michaelo Mike
Roni Iron
Dj Mak
Dj Syna

2022

Live Acts 
 Konstantinos Argiros
Josephine
FY
Kings
Anastasia
Claydee
MG
Konnie Metaxa
Mente Fuerte
Vlospa
Natasha Kay
Stefanos Pitsiniagas
Joanne
Ilias Bogdanos
Steve
Nassauce
Asimina
MC Daddy
Greg
KG
Dinamiss
Sigma
Ellize
Sidarta
Borek

Djs 
Antonis Dimitriadis
Xenia Ghali
Dj Paco
Bobito
Dj Timo
De La Cruz
Nikko Sunset
Dim Angelo
Marnick
DaPeace
Argie & Arva

References

Music festivals in Greece
Events in Athens
Summer events in Greece